The 1988 The Citadel Bulldogs football team represented The Citadel, The Military College of South Carolina in the 1988 NCAA Division I-AA football season. The Bulldogs were led by second-year head coach Charlie Taaffe and played their home games at Johnson Hagood Stadium. They played as members of the Southern Conference, as they have since 1936. In 1988, The Citadel made its first appearance in the I-AA playoffs.

Schedule

References

Citadel Bulldogs
The Citadel Bulldogs football seasons
Citadel football